The Moral Obligation to Be Intelligent is an essay in the collection The Moral Obligation to Be Intelligent, and Other Essays, published in 1915 by John Erskine, English professor at Columbia University.

The essay was first read before the Phi Beta Kappa Society of Amherst College, where Erskine taught before joining Columbia.  Later, it was published in quarterly magazine The Hibbert Journal in 1914.  During his tenure at Columbia  from 1909 and 1937, Erskine formulated General Honors Course. In the early 1920s he started teaching a great books course at Columbia,  which later founded the influential Great Books movement.

History
In 1963, the essay was published in the Gateway to the Great Books - Volume 10: Philosophical Essays, a 10-volume book series published by Encyclopædia Britannica Inc. in 1963.

Subsequently it was also included in the book of selected essays also titled The Moral Obligation to Be Intelligent: Selected Essays (New York: Farrar, Straus & Giroux) published posthumously in 2000),  edited by Lionel Trilling, another Columbia faculty and literary critic, and had an introduction by critic Leon Wieseltier. Trilling was one of Erskine's students and later taught the "Great Books" course himself; he chose the essay as the lead and the title as it characterized the essence of his selection.

Work

References

Bibliography

External links

 

1915 non-fiction books
1915 essays
American essays
Essay collections
Ethics literature